Bussières is a surname. Notable people with the name include:

 Pascale Bussières (born 1968), French Canadian actress
 Raymond Bussières (1907–1982), French film actor
 Pierre Bussières (1939–2014), Canadian politician
 Arthur de Bussières (1877–1913), Canadian poet
 Lizanne Bussières (born 1961), Canadian long-distance runner

See also
 Bussière